Marable is a surname. Notable people with the surname include:

C. J. Marable (born 1997), African-American football player
Fate Marable (1890–1947), American jazz pianist and bandleader
John Hartwell Marable (1786–1844), American politician
Larance Marable (1929–2012), American jazz drummer 
Manning Marable (1950–2011), American professor of public affairs, history and African-American Studies
Nick Marable (born 1987), American wrestler
Richard Marable (born 1949), American politician